This is a list of German words and expressions of French origin. Some of them were borrowed in medieval times, some were introduced by Huguenot immigrants in the 17th and 18th centuries and others have been borrowed in the 19th and 20th centuries. German Wiktionary lists about 120,000 German words without declensions and conjugations. Of these, more than 2300 words (about 2%) are categorized as German terms derived from French.

A 
à la carte
Abenteuer (adventure), from Middle High German āventiure, borrowed from Old French aventure 
Abonnement (subscription)
abonnieren (to subscribe)
Accessoire (accessory) 
ade (bye), from Old French adé 
adieu
Admiral (admiral)
Adresse (address) 
adressieren (to address), from French adresser
adrett (neat), from French adroit
Affäre (affair), borrowing from French affaire
Affront (affront)
Akkord (music chord, piecework), from French accord
akkreditieren (to accredit), from French accréditer
Akquise (acquisition), from French acquise
Akrobat (acrobat)
Akrobatik (acrobatics)
Akteur (protagonist), from French acteur
Aktionär (shareholder), from French actionnaire
aktuell (current, up to date, updated, live, recent), from French actuel
Allee (alley), from French allée
Allianz (alliance), from French alliance
Allüre (affectation), from French allure
Altruismus (altruism), from French altruisme
Amateur (amateur)
Ambition (ambition)
amourös (amorous), from French amoureux
amüsant (amusing), from French amusant
amüsieren (to amuse), from French amuser
Anarchie (anarchy), from Ancient Greek ἀναρχία (anarkhía) via Latin and French
Anarchist (anarchist), from French anarchiste
Anekdote (anecdote), from French anecdote
animieren (to encourage), from French animer
Annexion (annexation), from French annexion
annektieren (to annex), from French annexer
Annonce (classified ad), from French annonce
apart (fancy, distinctive), from French à part 
Aperitif (apéritif)
Appartement, Apartment (suite in a hotel), from French appartement
apropos (apropos), from French à propos
Arrangement (arrangement)
arrangieren (to arrange), from French arranger
arriviert (successful), from French arriver
Armee (military, army), from French armée.
arrogant (arrogant)
Artillerie (artillery)
Artist (acrobat), from French artiste
Asphalt (asphalt), from French asphalte
Aspik (aspic)
Atelier (artist's or photographer's studio)
Attaché (attaché)
Attacke (attack), from French attaque
attackieren (to attack), from French attaquer
Attentat (assassination)
Attitüde (attitude)
Attrappe (dummy, mockup)
Aubergine (eggplant)
Au-pair (au pair)
Avance
avancieren (to advance), from French  avancer
Avantgarde (avant-garde)
Aversion (aversion)

B 
Bagage (baggage; clan, gang)
Bagatelle 
bagatellisieren
Baguette
Baiser
Baisse
Bajonett (bayonet)
Balance
Balkon (balcony)
Ballade
Ballon
banal
banalisieren
Banalität
Bandage
Bande
Bankett
Bankier
Baracke
Barriere
Barrikade
Bassin
Bataillon
Batterie
Béchamelsauce 
beige
Belletristik
Beton
bigott
Bigotterie
Billard
Billet
Biskuit
Bistro
Biwak
bizarr
Blamage
blamieren
blanchieren
Blessur
blümerant
Bluse
Bohème
Bombardement
bombardieren
Bombe
Bonbon
Bonmot
Bordell
Bouillabaisse
Bouillon
Boule
Boulevard
Bourgeoisie
Boutique
Branche
Bravour
bravourös
Bredouille
Brigade
Brikett
brillant
Brillanz
Brimborium
brisant
Brise
Bronze
Brosche
Broschüre
brünett
brüsk
brüskieren
Budget
Buffet
Bulette
Bulletin
burlesk
Büro
Bürokrat
Büste

C 
Cabriolet
Café
Camembert
Canapé
Chalet
Champagner
Champignon
Chance
changieren
Chanson
Charakter
Charge
Charme
charmant
Charmeur
Chauffeur
Chaussee
Chauvinismus
Chauvinist
Chef
Chicorée
Chiffre
chiffrieren
Chose
Cidre
Claqueur
Clementine
Clique
Clochard
Clou
Cognac
Collage
Collier
Confiserie
Consommé
Contenance
Cordon bleu
Cornichon
Couleur
Coup
Coupé
Coupon 
Courage
Cousin
Cousine
Creme
Crème de la Crème
Crème fraiche
Crepe
Croissant
Croupier
Crouton
Cuvée

D 
Dame
Debakel
Debatte
debattieren
Debüt
Debütant
debütieren
dechiffrieren
Defensive
defilieren
Defizit
defizitär
Déjà-vu
dekadent
Dekadenz
deklassieren
Deko
Dekolleté
Dekoration
dekorativ
dekorieren
Delegation
delegieren
delikat
Delikatesse
Dementi
dementieren
demolieren
Demontage
Dependance
Depesche
deplatziert
Depot
deportieren
Depression
depressiv
Desaster
desaströs
desavouiren
Deserteur
Dessert
Dessous
Detail
Devise
dezent
Diamant
Digestif
Dilettant
dilettantisch
Diner
Diskothek
diskret
Disput
Distanz
distanziert
Dividende
Division
Domäne
Dorade
Dossier
Double
Dragee
dressieren
Dressur
Droge
Drogerie
drollig
Dusche
duschen
dutzend
dynamisch

E 
Eau de Cologne
echauffieren
Effet
egal
egalisieren
egalitär
Eklat
eklatant
Elan
elegant
Elite
elitär
Emaille
Emblem
Emotion
en bloc
Enfant terrible
Engagement
engagieren
Enklave
en masse
enorm
Ensemble
Entrecôte
Entree
en vogue 
Episode
Eskapade
Eskorte
eskortieren
Esprit
essenziell
etablieren
Etablissement
Etage
Etappe
Etat
etepetete
Etikett
Etikette
Etui
Experte
Expertise
Exposé, Exposee
extravagant
exzellent

F 
Fabrik
Facette
Fassade
Fauxpas
Fee
fein
Fenster
Feuilleton
Fiaker
Figur
finanzieren
Finesse
flambieren
Flanell
Florett
Fond
Fonds
Fondue
Fontäne
forcieren
Foyer
frappieren
fraternisieren
frau
Frikadelle
Frikassee
Friseur
Fritteuse
frittieren
frivol
Front

G 
Gage
galant
Garage
Garantie
garantieren
Garde
Garderobe
garnieren
Garnison
Garnitur
Gelatine
Gelee
genant
General
generös
genial
Genie
genieren
Genre
Gepard
Giraffe
Girlande
Gletscher
Gourmet
Gratin
gratinieren
Grippe
grotesk
Gruppe

H 
Hangar
Hasardeur
Hausse
Haute Couture
Haute Cuisine
Hautgout
Hommage
Hotel

I 
Ingenieur
Idee
Illusion
illustrieren
imaginär
imposant
invalide
imponieren
Infanterie
Infekt
Initiative
Insolvenz
Interieur
interessant
Intervention
Invasion

J 
Jalousie
Jargon
jonglieren
Journal
Journalist
Jury

K 
Kabarett
Kabinett
Kadett
Kampagne
Kanapee
Kapitän
Karaffe
Karambolage
Karosse
Karosserie
Karree
Karriere
Kaserne
kaschieren
Kavalier
Kavallerie
Kinkerlitzchen
Kino
Kiosk
Klavier
Klischee
Kokon
Kolibri
Kolonnade
Kolonne
Kollaborateur
Kolportage
Kommandeur
Kommode
Kommuniqué
Kompagnon
Komparse
Konfitüre
Kontrolleur
Kontur
konvertieren
Konvoi
Korps
Kostüm
Kotelett
Koteletten
Krawatte
Kreation
kriminell
Kritik
Kurier
Kuvert
Kuvertüre

L 
Laissez-faire
Lamelle
lancieren
Lampion
larmoyant
leger
Leutnant
Liaison
Likör
Limette
Limonade
Limousine
Livree
Loge
logieren
Longe
longieren
loyal

M 
Major
makaber
Malheur
Mandarine
Manege
Manöver
Mannequin
Margarine
Marge
Marinade
Marine
marinieren
Marionette
marode
Marodeur
Marone
Marotte
Marsch
marschieren
Maskottchen
Massage
Massaker
Masseur
massieren
Matinee
Mayonnaise
Medaille
Melange
Melasse
Memoiren
Menü
Meute
Milieu
Militär
Milliarde
Minister
Möbel
Mode
Montage
Monteur
Mousse au Chocolat
Munition

N 
Naturell
Necessaire
Negligé
nervös
Nippes
Niveau
nobel
Noblesse
Nocturne
Nuance
Nougat
nonchalant

O 
Oboe
Odor
Œuvre 
Offensive
Offerte
offiziell
Offizier
opportun
Opportunismus
Omelett
Onkel
Omnibus
Orange
Orangerie
ordinär
Orchideen
Ouvertüre

P 
Page
Paket
Paladin
Palaver
palavern
Palais
Palette
Palisade
Pampelmuse
Panade
panaschieren
panieren
Pantomime
Panzer (from Middle French pansier)
Paraplü
Parasol
Paravent
Parcours
Parfum, Parfüm
Parlament
Parodie
Partei
Parvenü
Passage
Passagier
passé
passieren
Passion
pasteurisieren
Patissier
Patrouille
Pavillon
Pazifismus
Pazifist
Pendant
Pension
perfide
Persiflage
peu à peu
Pilot
Pinzette
Pirouette
Pissoir
Plädoyer
Plagiat
Plakette
Plantage
Plateau
Plattitüde
Plombe
Plüsch
Pöbel
pochieren
Poesie
Pointe
Polemik
Polonaise
Pommes Frites
Ponton
populär
Porree
Portier
Portemonnaie
Portrait
Pose
Praline
Präsentation
Präsident
Präservativ
Präzision
professionell 
profitieren
Projektil
Promenade
proper
Puder
Püree

Q 
Qualifikation
Quarantäne
Quartier
Querelen
Queue
Quiche

R 
Raclette
Rage
Ragout
rangieren
rasieren
Ratatouille
Recherche
recherchieren
Redakteur
Redaktion
Referenz
Regie
Regime
Regisseur
Reklame
Rekrut
rekrutieren
Relais
Relief
Remoulade
Remis
Remise
Renaissance
Rendezvous
Renommee
Repertoire
Reportage
Requisite
Reserve
Reservoir
Restaurant
Ressentiment
Ressort
Ressource
Resolution
Resultat
Resümee
resümieren
Retusche
retuschieren
Revanche
Revolte
revoltieren
Revolution
Revue
riskant
Rivale
Robe
Rochade
rochieren
Roman
Rommé
Rondell
Rosine
Rouge
Roulade
Rouleau, Rollo
Roulette
Route
Routine
routiniert
Ruine

S 
Sabotage
Saboteur
Saison
Salär
Salon
salopp
Sanktion
Satin
Sauce
Schalotte
Scharade
schick
Schikane
schikanieren
Schock
schwadronieren
Sekretär
Sensation
sensibel
sentimental
servieren
Serviette
Service
Signal
Silhouette
Soiree
Solidarität
Sorbet
Souffleur
Souterrain
Souvenir
souverän
Spezialist
speziell
Spionage
Staffage
süffisant
Suggestion
suggestiv
Suite
Sujet
Szene
Szenerie

T 
Tableau
Tablett
Tablette
Taille
Tante
Taxi
Teint
Terrain
Terrasse
Terrine
Terror
Terrorist
Tête-à-Tête 
Textil
Thermometer
Timbre
Tirade
Toilette
Tonnage
touchieren
Tour
Tournee
Tournier
Trance
Tresor
Tribüne
Trikot
trist
Tristesse
Trottoir
Troubadour
Truppe
Turbine
türkis
Tusche

U 
Utopie

V 
Vagabund
vage
Variante
Variation
Varieté
Vase
Vaseline
Vernissage
Version
Verve
vif
Vignette
Vinaigrette
virtuell
violett
vis-a-vis
Visage
Visitation
Visite
vital
voilà
Voliere
voltigieren
Voyeur

W 
Wagon
Weste

Z 
Zigarette
zirkulär
zivil
Zivilisation

See also 
 List of English words of French origin 
 List of Spanish words of French origin
 List of French words of Germanic origin
 Loanword

References 

 Duden - Das Herkunftswörterbuch. Etymologie der deutschen Sprache. 2013. 

 
German language
German words of French origin